Isodectes is an extinct genus of dvinosaurian temnospondyl within the family Eobrachyopidae. The genus Saurerpeton, named in 1909, is considered to be a junior synonym of Isodectes.

References

Dvinosaurs
Cisuralian temnospondyls of North America
Permian geology of Texas
Fossil taxa described in 1896
Taxa named by Edward Drinker Cope